The economy of Saint Vincent and the Grenadines is heavily dependent on agriculture, being the world's leading producer of arrowroot and grows other exotic fruit, vegetables and root crops. Bananas alone account for upwards of 60% of the work force and 50% of merchandise exports in Saint Vincent and the Grenadines. Such reliance on a single crop makes the economy vulnerable to external factors. St. Vincent's banana growers benefited from preferential access to the European market. In view of the European Union's announced phase-out of this preferred access, economic diversification is a priority.

Tourism has grown to become a very important part of the economy. In 1993, tourism supplanted banana exports as the chief source of foreign exchange. The Grenadines have become a favourite of the up-market yachting crowd. The trend toward increasing tourism revenues will likely continue. In 1996, new cruise ship and ferry berths came on-line, sharply increasing the number of passenger arrivals. In 1998, total visitor arrivals stood at 202,109 with United States visitors constituting 2.7%, as most of the nation's tourists are from other countries in the Caribbean and the United Kingdom. Figures from 2005 record tourism's contribution to the economy at US$90 million.

St. Vincent and the Grenadines is a beneficiary of the U.S. Caribbean Basin Initiative. The country belongs to the Caribbean Community (CARICOM), which has signed a framework agreement with the United States to promote trade and investment in the region.

Macroeconomic statistics

Household income or consumption by percentage share:

Distribution of family income - Gini index:   N/A 

Agriculture - products:   banana, coconuts, sweet-potatoes, spices; small numbers of cattle, sheep, pigs, goats; fish

Industrial production growth rate:    -0.9% (1997 estimate)

Electricity - production:    115 million kWh (2005)

Electricity - consumption:    107 million kWh (2005)

Oil - consumption:    (2005 estimate)

Current account balance: $-0.22 billion (2013 estimate)
                          $-0.19 billion (2012 estimate)

Reserves of foreign exchange and gold:    $115 million (2013 estimate)
$111 million (2012 estimate)

2010 Index of Economic Freedom rank = 49thExchange rates''':   East Caribbean dollars per US dollar - 2.7 (2007), 2.7 (2006), 2.7 (2005), 2.7 (2003)

See also 
 Saint Vincent and the Grenadines
 Minister of Finance of Saint Vincent and the Grenadines

References 

 
Saint Vincent and the Grenadines